Bathafarn, the magazine of the Historical Society of the Methodist Church in Wales, is a bilingual English and Welsh-language publication containing essays and book reviews. It was established in 1946 and based in Cardiff.

The journal has been digitised by the Welsh Journals Online project at the National Library of Wales.

References

External links
Bathafarn at Welsh Journals Online
Bathafarn at World Cat

History magazines published in the United Kingdom
Magazines established in 1946
Mass media in Cardiff
Methodism in Wales
Welsh-language magazines
Magazines published in Wales
Book review magazines